Israel Alvin "Izzy" Lang (February 2, 1942 - October 10, 2008) was a former American football running back who played for six seasons in the National Football League. He was drafted by the Philadelphia Eagles in the 18th round of the 1964 NFL Draft. He played for the Eagles from 1964–1968, and the Los Angeles Rams in 1969. He played college football at Tennessee State.

Professional career

Philadelphia Eagles
Lang was selected by the Philadelphia Eagles in the 18th round (240th overall) of the 1964 NFL Draft. He was mainly a backup during his first two seasons in the NFL, and he earned the starting running back job in 1966 NFL season. In the season-opener against the St. Louis Cardinals, Lang rushed for 65 yards on 16 carries. In week 2, he rushed for 114 yards on 16 attempts. Lang was named Most Valuable Player of the 1966 Playoff Bowl, even though he did not start in the game. The Eagles lost the game to the Baltimore Colts, 20–14.

In 1968, Lang rushed for 235 yards on 35 carries. After the season, he asked to be traded from the team.

Los Angeles Rams
On July 7, 1969, Lang was traded to the Los Angeles Rams in exchange for defensive end John Zook and wide receiver Harold Jackson. He retired after the season.

After football
Lang made an appearance in the 1970 film Where's Poppa? as Muthafucka.

Lang was arrested 24 times after his retirement. On November 15, 1988, he was arrested for impersonating then-New York Giants running back Joe Morris by forging checks. He had convinced United Jersey Bank to cash a check in Morris' name. He had also impersonated Lawrence Taylor, Leonard Marshall and Doug Williams. He is buried at Hart Island (Bronx).

References

External links
 

1942 births
Living people
American football running backs
Los Angeles Rams players
Philadelphia Eagles players
Tennessee State Tigers football players
American fraudsters
Forgers
Players of American football from Tampa, Florida
Burials on Hart Island